Dan Air is a Romanian airline headquartered in Bucharest, Romania, founded in early 2018 as Just Us Air, and rebranded to its current name in late 2021. It has been operating charter flights and flights with its own aircraft for various other airlines, and it is set to commence regular passenger flight operations under its own brand in June 2023.

Operations
The company will begin regular passenger flights under its own brand in June 2023, from the Henri Coandă International Airport in Bucharest, Romania, and from the new airport in Brașov, Romania, that is set to be opened that month. It will fly mainly to destinations in Western and Central Europe, but also to Lebanon and Israel.

Fleet
The company has a fleet of four aircraft: one Airbus A319 and three Airbus A320s.

References

External links

Airlines of Romania
Airlines established in 2018
Companies based in Bucharest
Romanian brands